Kathrin Hammes (born 9 January 1989 in Cologne) is a German road bicycle racer, who currently rides for UCI Women's Continental Team .

She won the gold medal at the 2014 World University Cycling Championship in the road race and the silver medal in the time trial. She represented her country at the 2011 Summer Universiade where she finished 14th in the road race. She also participated in the under-23 road race at the 2011 European Road Championships.

Hammes studies at the University of Freiburg as of 2014.

Major results
2014
 World University Cycling Championship
1st Road race
2nd Time trial
 1st Stage 7 Tour de l'Ardèche
2019
 1st  Overall Thüringen Ladies Tour
2021
 1st  Mountains classification Thüringen Ladies Tour

References

External links
Kathrin Hammes at Racing Students website 

German female cyclists
1989 births
Living people
Road racing cyclists
Cyclists from Cologne
University of Freiburg alumni
20th-century German women
21st-century German women